DSN Music is an American record label and music licensing company that was founded in 2003 as a subsidiary of Arizona-based Digital Syndicate Network (DSN). DSN Music was founded by former EMusic executive Guy Giuliano. DSN issues music in the heavy metal and hip hop genres. The label also distributed records under subsidiary labels Tom Kat Records

DSN Music has also produced several music documentaries, and television projects such as "Crank It Up!", "Omen... Back For More" and "Static! The Rockumentary".

Roster

Action Toolbelt
Agnus Jackson
Beyond Perception
Black Eyed Children
Blackout
Blue Hail'''
Bratana
Cage9
Creeper
Deathgrip
Danimal
Defaced
Dust (band)
Edge Piece
Futile Attempt
Headless Charlie
Jonelle Marie
Left Standing
Lit Soul
Lynch
Mercury Bullet
 Omen (band)
Outlaw Devils
Project Rogue
Psycho Sister
R.O.L.
Roaring Truth
Ron Marks
Salva Me
SlyKat
Society 1
Subsonic
Sylo
The Raygun Girls
The Rudy Boy Experiment
Thomas Troutman
Ugly Little Doll
Wicked Deception
World Beneath World

References

External links
 
 

Record labels established in 2003
American independent record labels
Hip hop record labels
Heavy metal record labels
American record labels